Nimantha Gunasiri (born 1 November 1996) is a Sri Lankan cricketer. He made his first-class debut for Burgher Recreation Club in the 2018–19 Premier League Tournament on 1 February 2019. He made his List A debut on 14 December 2019, for Burgher Recreation Club in the 2019–20 Invitation Limited Over Tournament.

References

External links
 

1996 births
Living people
Sri Lankan cricketers
Burgher Recreation Club cricketers
Nugegoda Sports and Welfare Club cricketers
Place of birth missing (living people)